The RRS Charles Darwin was a Royal Research Ship belonging to the British Natural Environment Research Council. Since 2006, she has been the geophysical survey vessel, RV Ocean Researcher,

History
RRS Charles Darwin was built in 1985 by Appledore Shipbuilders in Devon. Named after the eminent English naturalist, she was used primarily for research in oceanography, geology, and geophysics.

Purchased by Gardline Marine Sciences Limited of Great Yarmouth, she was renamed RV Ocean Researcher, and now conducts geophysical surveys.

Science cruises
RRS Charles Darwin carried out 180 research cruises, worldwide, in her 21 years as a Natural Environment Research Council ship. The first cruise, in 1985, in the Northeast Atlantic, was led by Professor John Gould. Researchers from the National Oceanography Centre, Southampton, studying climate change, have used RRS Charles Darwin to investigate the slowing of the Gulf Stream. Her final cruise was a geophysical survey for the British Geological Survey.

Gallery

See also 
 RV Neil Armstrong - United States equivalent 
 RV Knorr - Predecessor to the Neil Armstrong

Footnotes

Natural Environment Research Council
Research vessels of the United Kingdom
Oceanographic instrumentation
1984 ships
Ships built in Devon
Charles Darwin